(officially stylized as amiibo; plural: Amiibo) is a toys-to-life platform by Nintendo, which was launched in November 2014. It consists of a wireless communications and storage protocol for connecting figurines to the Wii U, Nintendo 3DS, and Nintendo Switch video game consoles. These figurines are similar in form and functionality to that of the Skylanders, Disney Infinity and Lego Dimensions series of toys-to-life platforms. The Amiibo platform was preannounced to potentially accommodate any form of toy, specifically including general plans for future card games. These toys use near field communication (NFC) to interact with supported video game software, potentially allowing data to be transferred in and out of games and across multiple platforms.

Amiibo functionality can be used directly with the Nintendo Switch, Wii U, and New Nintendo 3DS consoles by using built-in NFC readers. In addition, the rest of the 3DS hardware line can use an official NFC adapter. By September 2016, Nintendo reported that 39 million Amiibo toys had been sold, along with more than 30 million Amiibo cards.
By September 2022, total sales reached 77 million toys.

History

Development 

Toys for Bob and its parent company Activision had offered an opportunity for Nintendo to be a partner in a new video game franchise known as Skylanders, which would use RFID-equipped character figurines and a special reader component to interact with the game itself, and could store data on the figurine itself such as the corresponding character's statistics. While Nintendo passed on the exclusivity deal, the franchise itself quickly became one of Activision's most successful franchises upon its launch as a spin-off of the Spyro the Dragon series, and also resulted in competition from Disney Interactive Studios, who released a game with a similar concept known as Disney Infinity in 2013.

In March 2013, Nintendo unveiled Pokémon Rumble U, the first game for the Wii U to use the Wii U GamePad's near-field communications support to enable the use of its own interactive figurines. During an investors' meeting in May 2014, Nintendo presented a prototype of a more comprehensive figurine platform for its 3DS and Wii U consoles, which was designed so that the figurines could be used across multiple games. The new system was codenamed NFP, standing for either "Nintendo Figurine Platform" or "NFC Featured Platform", and was slated to be officially unveiled during E3.

On June 10, 2014, during E3 2014, Nintendo officially announced the Amiibo platform, and that Super Smash Bros. for Wii U would be among the first games to provide features integrating with Amiibo figurines.

In a corporate policy event after the launch of the Amiibo platform, Nintendo executive Shigeru Miyamoto addressed the platform's future by stating that the company was "now moving forward with projects that make use of NFC in a variety of unique ways. Nintendo is known as a video game company, but in fact, it is also a toy company."

Release 

Super Smash Bros. Amiibo toys were first released in North America on November 21, 2014, in Europe on November 28, 2014, and in Japan on December 6, 2014, along with the release of Super Smash Bros. for Wii U.

The Super Mario series, featuring Mario, Luigi, Peach, Yoshi, Bowser, and Toad, arrived on March 20, 2015, for both regions.

In 2015, Nintendo began to extend the Amiibo line into new form factors; on February 27, 2015, Nintendo CEO Satoru Iwata revealed that the company had plans to release Amiibo-enabled trading cards. On April 1, 2015, Nintendo unveiled Animal Crossing: Happy Home Designer, a spin-off in the Animal Crossing series that utilizes cards. Nintendo also unveiled Amiibo yarn plushies as a tie-in for Yoshi's Woolly World.

During the E3 2015 Nintendo Direct on June 16, 2015, Activision revealed Bowser and Donkey Kong Amiibo (Hammer Slam Bowser and Turbo Charge Donkey Kong) and vehicles for use in Skylanders: SuperChargers. These toys are compatible with either the Skylanders games or Amiibo-compatible games by means of a mode switch on their bases. They will work across all Nintendo platform versions of Skylanders: SuperChargers. The Amiibo are also compatible with all Nintendo platform versions of Skylanders: Imaginators.

On August 27, 2015, an Amiibo toy of the titular character from the indie video game Shovel Knight was unveiled, which will unlock content exclusive to the 3DS and Wii U versions of the game and its future installments. It is the first Amiibo toy of a non-Nintendo character that is not associated with a first-party title; previous Amiibo toys of third-party characters were associated with Super Smash Bros. Additionally, production and distribution of the figurine will be overseen by the game's publisher, Yacht Club Games, rather than Nintendo (except in Japan where the latter is the publisher), although it will still officially be marketed by Nintendo as part of the Amiibo line as a form of brand licensing. Explaining the arrangement, a Nintendo representative stated that "we were like, what's one thing that Nintendo could do that nobody [else] could ever do?"

The Amiibo line for The Legend of Zelda initially began solely with the Wolf Link figurine, which is mainly used in The Legend of Zelda: Twilight Princess HD and later Breath of the Wild. It expanded with the 30th Anniversary collection (8-bit Link, Ocarina of Time Link, The Wind Waker Link, and The Wind Waker Zelda), and the Breath of the Wild collection (Archer Link, Rider Link, Zelda, Bokoblin, Mipha, Daruk, Revali, Urbosa and the Guardian figurine). At E3 2017, Nintendo unveiled several new Amiibo figurines, including wedding-themed Mario, Peach and Bowser figurines which coincided with the launch of the Nintendo Switch game Super Mario Odyssey, as well as figurines of Chrom and Tiki from the Fire Emblem series to tie in with the release of Fire Emblem Warriors on Switch and New 3DS systems. Two Metroid-themed Amiibo figures released alongside the 3DS remake of Metroid II, Metroid: Samus Returns, and figurines released later based around the four Champions in The Legend of Zelda: Breath of the Wild. Third-party software developer Bethesda Softworks announced that existing Zelda figurines would be compatible with the Nintendo Switch port of The Elder Scrolls V: Skyrim, allowing players to obtain select Zelda items and clothing for their Dragonborn, including the Master Sword, Hylian Shield and the Champion's Tunic from Breath of the Wild.

Collectibility and supply issues 

Upon initial launch, the Amiibo line quickly spiked in popularity, with preorders selling out before the products became available to the public. While Nintendo CEO Satoru Iwata stated that Amiibo will be kept in stock, he also explained that some will be "limited-time offers which will cede their positions to new ones once they are sold out". The rarity of certain Amiibo figurines influenced the prices held by online retailers and auctions, of which most can be seen offering select items at prices above the retail price. In Nintendo's 3rd Quarter Financial Results Briefing for the Fiscal Year Ending March 2015, Satoru Iwata expressed surprise at such online auctions that offered "premium prices" of sold out Amiibo toys.

On April 2, 2015, when preorders were being taken for the May 29 release of the Super Smash Bros. series Wave 4 and the Splatoon series, the US preorder process crashed both GameStop's website and in-store register system. Nintendo acknowledged these issues in early May 2015. Amazon forwent the entire preorder process for those waves; it instead blocked out specific time intervals on their release date during which the non-retailer exclusive Amiibo and the Super Mario series Silver Mario Amiibo were available. The retailer continued this practice with its exclusive release of the Palutena Amiibo as well as those released on September 11, 2015.

In May 2015 in the UK, a truck was stolen that contained preorders of the special edition of Splatoon, which included a rare Squid Inkling Amiibo as a preorder bonus: the only way to obtain the figure in the UK. As a result, Nintendo lacked the stock to supply the Squid Inkling Amiibo to those who preordered, and offered Inkling Girl or Inkling Boy Amiibo instead alongside a standard edition with a £10 refund, or full refunds.

In response to the lack of certain Amiibo toys in the United States, Satoru Iwata explained on February 17, 2015, that "an ongoing labor dispute on the west coast" has delayed the "discharge of cargo over the past six months", and is the cause of the absences of certain Amiibo toys intended to be delivered before its launch in November. Following this announcement, rarer Amiibo toys such as Wii Fit Trainer, Meta Knight, and Ike have been receiving limited re-releases in North America. For the US, the exclusive Best Buy release of the Dark Pit figurine, the retailer announced it would not take any preorders or online orders and the item would be limited to one per customer. While some news sources such as Kotaku came out in favour of Best Buy's practice, alternatively in response to this (and the difficulty of acquiring previous retailer-exclusives), others, such as Brian Altano, Jose Otero, and Peer Schneider of IGN's Nintendo Voice Chat podcast, have encouraged American collectors to import these hard-to-find items.

Hardware support 
The Wii U, New Nintendo 3DS, New Nintendo 2DS XL, and Nintendo Switch contain integrated NFC support, and are Amiibo-compatible. On Wii U, toys are scanned using an NFC reader contained within the Wii U GamePad. Amiibo support was formally introduced to the consoles' firmware between November and December 2014; these updates added an Amiibo menu to the system settings area, allowing users to scan, register, and erase data from toys. The Nintendo Switch similarly features an NFC reader in both the Joy-Con R and Pro Controller.

A separate NFC reader accessory allows use of Amiibo on the original Nintendo 3DS, 3DS XL, and 2DS models; in Japan, released in "Summer 2015", and released alongside Animal Crossing: Happy Home Designer in North America. The New Nintendo 3DS, New 3DS XL, and New 2DS XL contain an integrated NFC reader utilizing the touch (bottom) screen.

Amiibo data communication 
Supported games offer one of two kinds of Amiibo compatibility; the ability to access an Amiibo toy's NFC tag and store data, and read-only recognition. Each Amiibo toy largely corresponds to a specific game that can access its storage space, though some may have multiple games that can use it. However, each Amiibo toy can only store data from one compatible game at a time, meaning data must be deleted to use it with a different title. For example, a Mario Amiibo figurine containing data from Super Smash Bros. for Nintendo 3DS and Wii U must have the data for that game deleted to store data from Mario Party 10. Many games offer compatibility with specific Amiibo toys on a read-only basis, allowing for additional content to be unlocked in that game. For example, using certain figurines with Mario Kart 8 or Mario Kart 8 Deluxe unlocks Mii costumes based on the corresponding character. Multiple variations of the same character offer the same compatibility, although special variations can unlock unique content with specific games. Existing Wii U and 3DS games can receive updates for Amiibo functionality. Due to their co-development effort on Super Smash Bros. for Nintendo 3DS and Wii U, Bandai Namco Entertainment were the first third-party publishers to embrace the Amiibo concept in some of their own games.

List of Amiibo 
The following list features all known NFC items branded under Amiibo, originally produced in the form of character figurines as of 2014, then cards as of 2015, and other types in the future. Nintendo designed all Amiibo characters to be cross-compatible with all games that support specific Amiibo characters, regardless of whichever model line these characters belong to; for example, Mario figurines from both the Super Smash Bros. and Super Mario series have the same functionality. Yoshi line are soft dolls instead of hard plastic figurines.

There are currently  Amiibo figurines, 3 Amiibo card series, and {{#expr:
1
+1
+1
+2
+2
+2
+2
+1
+1

+1
+3
+3}} noted variants on this list.

List of Animal Crossing Amiibo cards 
The following is a list of all confirmed Amiibo cards for the Animal Crossing series of games. Series 1, 2, 3 and 4 consist of 100 cards each, while Series 5 consists of 48 cards. Additionally, there are five cards which aren't part of any series. After the announcement that New Leaf would receive an Amiibo update a new series of 50 Animal Crossing RV cards was announced plus an additional series of 6 cards based around characters by Sanrio. Later, after a Nintendo Direct on September 23, 2021, Nintendo confirmed on the official Animal Crossing Twitter account that a Series 5 of Amiibo cards was being produced and implied it may feature villagers introduced in Animal Crossing: New Horizons, as well as returning villagers. Series 5 was released on November 5, 2021.

Exclusives 
In North America, Australia, and New Zealand, at launch some Amiibo were only available in selected retailers. In Australia and New Zealand, this practice is limited to Mario (Silver Edition), Dark Hammer Slam Bowser, and Dark Turbo Charge Donkey Kong being limited to EB Games, Mario (Gold Edition) being limited to Target in Australia and Mighty Ape in New Zealand, Animal Crossing: New Leaf – Welcome Amiibo Sanrio Collaboration Pack and Qbby Amiibo being limited to the Official Nintendo AU/NZ eBay Store; however, in North America it is much more widespread. Some characters, such as Villager, were originally non-exclusives, but later became exclusive to retailers during restocks.

See also

 Nintendo e-Reader
 GameCube – Game Boy Advance link cable
 Transfer Pak
 VMU

Notes

References

External links 
 
 

Toy figurines
Nintendo 3DS
Nintendo accessories
Nintendo Switch accessories
Nintendo toys
Wii U
Toys-to-life games
Products introduced in 2014